Ritsuko Akagi (赤木リツコ, Akagi Ritsuko) is the head of the first section of the technology department at Nerv headquarters, and one of the main developers of Evangelion units in Hideaki Anno's 1995 mecha anime series Neon Genesis Evangelion. In 2005 during college, Ritsuko met Misato Katsuragi, who became her friend, and befriended her boyfriend Kaji, whom Ritsuko considered annoying. In 2008, after completing her studies at Tokyo-2, Ritsuko joined Gehirn Research Center as the head of Project E. Following her transfer to the special agency Nerv, Ritsuko became responsible for the management of the Magi supercomputer. At Nerv, Ritsuko comes into close contact with her mother's lover Gendo Ikari, learning secret information that is withheld from almost all other members of the organization.

She was voiced by Yuriko Yamaguchi in the original series, Sue Ulu in the english animation dubbing, Erica Lindbeck for the Netflix dub and  Mary Faber for the Amazon Prime Video Rebuild.

Characterisation 
Ritsuko is rational, and has a strong sense of discipline and detached judgment. She finds it difficult to reconcile these sides of her character, which are often a source of violent, emotional contrasts. Ristuko shows great determination and indifference, and, hesitates to talk about herself, even with longtime friends. Despite her rational and reserved exterior, Ritsuko is sensitive, expressive, and passionate. At the beginning of her university career, Ritsuko dyes her hair blonde to differentiate herself from her mother Naoko. She later falls in love with Gendo Ikari, with whom she enters into a secret romantic relationship and offers him her scientific skills and body. Ritsuko is jealous of Rei, the center of Gendo's attention, and feeling used and betrayed, she carries out reckless acts of revenge against him. In The End of Evangelion, Ritsuko is no longer able to manage her feelings of love and hate; she attempts to destroy the Nerv headquarters, uttering the phrase "Mom, do you want to die with me?". However, the Casper computer, in which Naoko's personality is imprinted, refuses the command to self-destruct, and Ritsuko is shot dead by Gendo. Newtype magazine compared Ritsuko to previous Anno characters, such as Kazumi Amano from Gunbuster and Electra from Nadia.

References 

Television characters introduced in 1995
Animated characters introduced in 1995
Characters in animated television series
Fictional Japanese people in anime and manga
Fictional scientists in television
Fictional scientists in films
Female characters in anime and manga
Neon Genesis Evangelion characters
Science fiction film characters
Female characters in animated series
Female characters in animation
Female characters in film
Fictional female scientists